Lloyd Park (also known as Lloyd Country Park) is a  park on the outskirts of central Croydon, Greater London, managed by the London Borough of Croydon. It is bordered by Coombe Road to the south and Lloyd Park Avenue to the west. To the north, access is from Deepdene and Mapledale Avenue, and the park adjoins Grimwade Avenue and Addiscombe Cricket Club. To the east the park is bordered by Shirley Park Golf Course. It was created from land owned by Frank Lloyd (son of Edward Lloyd) a newspaper proprietor who died in 1927 which was bequeathed to the Borough of Croydon by his family, after his death.

The Tramlink, New Addington line, runs along the southern edge of the park parallel to Coombe Road.

Description and usage
The park is not enclosed, as would typically be the case for suburban parks. Coombe Road is bordered by a low hedge and grass-covered earth banks have been raised along the open Lloyd Park Avenue side to deter vehicular access. It is open 24 hours a day throughout the year. The main entrance is from Coombe Road, immediately adjacent to the Lloyd Park tram stop, where two car-parking areas are available. 'The Lounge Cafe' is also sited next to the car parks.

Facilities available include rugby and football pitches, bowls, hard court tennis, children's playground, car parking, cafe, open-air gymnasium, disc golf, changing rooms and facilities, orienteering, cross country courses, horse riding and a pond.

Towards the northern edge of the park is an area known as The Squashes, where a line of springs emerge during wet weather, the most frequent being Rippingill.

Until 2010, the park was regularly used for the Croydon Summer Festival, hosting a variety of musical acts including, Martha and the Vandellas, The Proclaimers, The Lightning Seeds, The Damned and Courtney Pine. It is also the venue for the Croydon Town and Country Show.

In May/June 2019, the inaugural The Ends festival, headlined by Damian Marley, was held in the park.

See also
List of parks and open spaces in the London Borough of Croydon
Parks and open spaces in the London Borough of Croydon
Coombe, Croydon
Coombe Wood

References

External links

Lloyd Park at Croydon Council website

Parks and open spaces in the London Borough of Croydon
Urban public parks in the United Kingdom
1927 establishments in England